General Dynamics Mission Systems - Canada, formerly Computing Devices Canada, is a technology-based electronic systems, systems integration, and in-service support to defence organizations and public security markets in Canada and abroad. Its parent company is General Dynamics.

History
Computing Devices Canada was incorporated on August 31, 1948 as a global defence contractor. The company was founded by two Polish immigrants to Canada, George Glinski and Joe Norton, to support the rebuilding of Canada's military after the Second World War. The company got its start by manufacturing the Position and Homing Indicator (PHI), a device developed at the National Research Council that kept track of an aircraft's position and indicated its return route to base. One large contract that had a significant influence on the company's growth was for the Kicksorter, a digital-pulse counter designed for the Atomic Energy of Canada Laboratories (AECL) in Chalk River. If the Kicksorter had been slightly modified to do simple arithmetic operations, it would have been a rudimentary computer. AECL purchased a large number of these devices between 1957 and 1963, when they were replaced by one of the early computers in the PDP series manufactured by the Digital Equipment Corporation (DEC). Another contract was to design and construct a large digital simulator for the Royal Canadian Navy that was never completed.

During the 1990s, Computing Devices Canada implemented the Iris Digital Communications System, which was a thorough communications upgrade for the Canadian Army, and on the strength of that effort, was awarded the Bowman contract to perform a similar effort for the British Army.

In 1998, General Dynamics purchased the company, renaming it to General Dynamics Canada.

Products and programs

The Aurora Program is the mid-life upgrade of the CP140 Aurora aircraft operated by the Canadian Department of National Defence as a long-range maritime patrol platform for surface and undersea surveillance roles. GD Mission Systems — Canada has been contracted to develop the Data Management System (DMS) and Acoustic Suite subsystems. The latest release brings with it new capabilities in terms of Link 16, BLOS-WGS satcom and self-defence in the form of a Directed IR Countermeasures system (DIRCM).

In 2014, they were awarded two contracts on the Mercury Global Project.  The first contract is for the design-and-build of a network of Mercury Global anchor stations valued at $59.1 million.  Through this network of antennas, the Department of National Defence will access the Wideband Global Satellite (WGS) constellation and will be able to provide secure communications for deployed Canadian Forces. The second contract provides ongoing in-service support and is valued at $8.5 million.

References

External links
 Official website

General Dynamics
General Dynamics Mission Systems
Defence companies of Canada
Aerospace companies of Canada